Dhankhar is a Jat surname. Notable people with this surname include:

 Jagdeep Dhankhar (born 1951), Indian politician, Vice President of India
 Sudesh Dhankhar, Indian doctor, Second Lady of India
 

Indian surnames